Praia do Sul State Biological Reserve is a biological reserve on the island of Ilha Grande, in the State of Rio de Janeiro, in Brazil.

History

The reserve was created on 2 December 1981 on Praia do Sul, Ilha Grande, in the municipality of Angra dos Reis.
The purpose was to preserve the natural ecosystems home to indigenous flora and fauna.
It was integrated with the  Aventureiro Marine State Park, created in 1990, which covers the shores and waters of the bay to the south of the reserve.
It is within the  Tamoios Environmental Protection Area, created in 1982.
It is part of the  Bocaina Mosaic, created in 2006.

On 28 May 2014 the area was reduced by 2.7% to accommodate the Vila do Aventureiro.
The former marine state park and the small part of the biological reserve is now the Aventureiro Sustainable Development Reserve.
A skeleton found in the reserve was dated to 3,000 years ago, and showed that he was a strong rower and expert diver.

Status

The reserve is open only for educational or research purposes.
About half of the reserve is covered in dense Atlantic Forest, with many species of flora and fauna including parrots, otters, woodpeckers, shore birds, monkeys, armadillos, pacas and snakes.
There is a rich variety of rainforest trees and large mangroves.

References

Sources

Protected areas established in 1981
Protected areas of Rio de Janeiro (state)
Biological reserves of Brazil
1981 establishments in Brazil